Anomophysis plagiata is a species of longhorn beetle native to Central Asia including Afghanistan, India, Pakistan, Sri Lanka, Nepal, Myanmar and Laos.

References 

Cerambycinae
Insects of Sri Lanka
Insects of India
Insects of Afghanistan
Insects of Pakistan
Insects of Nepal
Insects of Myanmar
Insects of Laos
Insects described in 1884